The men's 400 metres at the 1966 European Athletics Championships was held in Budapest, Hungary, at Népstadion on 30 and 31 August, and 1 September 1966.

Medalists

Results

Final
1 September

Semi-finals
31 August

Semi-final 1

Semi-final 2

Heats
30 August

Heat 1

Heat 2

Heat 3

Heat 4

Heat 5

Participation
According to an unofficial count, 30 athletes from 17 countries participated in the event.

 (1)
 (1)
 (1)
 (1)
 (3)
 (1)
 (3)
 (1)
 (2)
 (1)
 (1)
 (3)
 (3)
 (1)
 (1)
 (3)
 (3)

References

400 metres
400 metres at the European Athletics Championships